Avalan Rural District is a rural district (dehestan) in Muchesh District, Kamyaran County, Kurdistan Province, Iran. At the 2006 census, its population was 3,626, in 918 families. The rural district has 17 villages.

References 

Rural Districts of Kurdistan Province
Kamyaran County